Maxi Curran is a Gaelic football manager from Downings, County Donegal. 

He attended Mulroy College in Milford for his secondary education.

Curran succeeded McGuinness as Donegal under-21 football team manager on 19 January 2012. He has also been manager of the Donegal under-16 and minor football teams and clubs County Donegal and County Tyrone. He has also been a manager in ladies' Gaelic football.

In Curran's first season as Donegal under-21 football team manager, Donegal were beaten in Ulster by Tyrone. Part of the 2012 All-Ireland Senior Football Championship Final-winning team, he was with them when they appeared on The Late Late Show.

Curran took charge of Donegal for the 2013 Dr McKenna Cup. He resigned as a sport for the senior team in 2013. McGuinness ousted him.

In December 2019, Curran was unveiled as manager of the Donegal Under-14 Academy Squad.

In November 2020, and ahead of the 2021 season, Curran took over as team trainer at the Gaoth Dobhair club under the management of Kevin Cassidy and Joe Duffy.

He succeeded Michael Murphy as manager of LYIT in 2022.

References

Year of birth missing (living people)
Living people
Gaelic football managers
Gaelic football selectors
Ladies' Gaelic football managers